Dustin Wallace Milligan (born July 28, 1985) is a Canadian actor, known for his role as Ethan Ward on the teen drama television series 90210 from 2008 until 2009, Tom Cummings in the Canadian spy thriller television series X Company from 2015 until 2016, Ted Mullens on the Canadian television comedy series Schitt's Creek from 2015 until 2020, and Josh Carter on American television comedy series Rutherford Falls from 2021 until 2022. He has also appeared in a number of films.

Personal life
Milligan was born in Yellowknife, Northwest Territories, the son of Jean Wallace, a former Yellowknife city councillor, and Brian Milligan. Since October 2010, he has been in a relationship with actress Amanda Crew.

Career
Milligan is known for playing the role of Ted Mullens on Schitt’s Creek and Ethan Ward in The CW's 90210, a spin-off of the 1990s primetime drama Beverly Hills, 90210. He was written out of the show at the end of the first season.

His film credits include Final Destination 3 (2006), Slither (2006), The Butterfly Effect 2 (2006), In the Land of Women (2007), Butterfly on a Wheel (2007), The Messengers (2007), and Extract (2009).

Milligan starred in the short-lived primetime suspense drama Runaway, picked up by The CW for its inaugural season in September 2006, but cancelled in October after only three of nine episodes completed had been aired.

He starred in the Canadian network CTV's made-for-TV film Eight Days to Live playing The O.C. star Kelly Rowan's missing son. He has also had minor roles in the television series The Days, Andromeda, The Dead Zone, Alice, I Think, Supernatural and the CBC's Da Vinci's City Hall.

In 2010, he played Kyle Halsted in the indie action crime drama film Repeaters, co-starring Amanda Crew. In 2011, he starred as Nick in the horror thriller shark movie Shark Night 3D. In 2011, he played Nick Nader in the suspense thriller The Entitled and Rory in the indie film Sisters & Brothers. In 2012, he starred as Sam Reed in the Lifetime Original Movie Love at the Christmas Table co-starring Danica McKellar. He appeared in the Funny or Die video Post Apocalypse News with Elisabeth Hower. In 2013, he played Callum Beck in the indie thriller Ferocious.

In 2014, Milligan starred as Detective Reverend Grizzly Night-Bear in a vintage 1970s "buddy cop" movie Bad City. He played the role of John in the James Wan produced horror film Demonic. In 2015, he landed the main role in the spy thriller TV show X Company, where he played Tom Cummings. He appeared in all six seasons of Schitt's Creek, playing the role of veterinarian Ted Mullens. He had a guest spot as Blaine in the TV show Silicon Valley. Later in 2015, he had a lead role as Ogden in the indie drama Sequoia co-starring Aly Michalka.

In 2016, he starred as Cory in the indie comedy film Me Him Her. The movie was written and directed by Max Landis. He starred as Nicholas Gray in the indie mystery thriller film Primary. He is set to star in the film A Family Man. He plays the role of aggressive young recruiter at Blackridge who is training under Butler's character. He played the role of Sgt. Hugo Friedkin, a dimwitted government agent working with Riggins, in the BBC America series Dirk Gently's Holistic Detective Agency.

In 2020, Milligan was a contestant on RuPaul's Secret Celebrity Drag Race. After winning the mini-challenge, he selected Nina West as his drag mentor. He competed against Alex Newell and Matt Iseman and raised $20,000 for the charity Project HEAL.

Filmography

Film

Television

Web

Music videos

References

External links

 
 

1985 births
Living people
21st-century Canadian male actors
Canadian male film actors
Canadian male television actors
Canadian male voice actors
Male actors from the Northwest Territories
People from Yellowknife